Rayda Jacobs (born 6 March 1947) is a South African writer and film-maker.

She was born in Diep River, Cape Town and began writing at a young age. In 1968, she moved to Toronto, Canada. She married there, had two children and later divorced. Her first book The Middle Children, a collection of short stories, was published in Canada in 1994. Jacobs returned to South Africa the following year. Her novel Eyes of the Sky, published in 1996, received the Herman Charles Bosman Prize for English fiction.

She wrote a series of feature articles for the Cape Times and hosted radio programs. She has also produced and directed documentaries for television, including God Has Many Names and Portrait of Muslim Women.

Selected works 
 The Slave Book, novel (1998)
 Sachs Street, novel (2001)
 Confessions of a Gambler, novel (2003), received The Sunday Times Fiction Prize and the Herman Charles Bosman Prize, adapted for film

References

External links 
 

1947 births
Living people
South African writers
South African film producers
South African film directors
Writers from Cape Town
South African emigrants to Canada